Hendrik Arnoldus "Henk" Vermetten (19 August 1895 – 7 August 1964) was a Dutch footballer.

Starting his career with DVS from Schiedam, Vermetten spent his senior career with HBS. There, he won the Netherlands Football League Championship in the 1924–25 season.

Between 1924 and 1925 and in 1930 he gained six caps for the Netherlands, where he was captain twice. With the Netherlands he took part in the men's tournament at the 1924 Summer Olympics, where they finished fourth. After a five-year absence, he made his return to the Netherlands national team in 1930.

Honours
HBS
 Netherlands Football League Championship: 1924–25

References

External links
 
 

1895 births
1964 deaths
Dutch footballers
Netherlands international footballers
Olympic footballers of the Netherlands
Footballers at the 1924 Summer Olympics
Footballers from Rotterdam
Association football forwards
Hermes DVS players
HBS Craeyenhout players